Judith Deutsch-Haspel (born Judith Deutsch;  ; 18 August 1918 in Vienna – 20 November 2004 in Herzliya, Israel) was a swimming champion who held every Austrian women's middle and long distance freestyle record in 1935.

Biography
As a Jewish child, Deutsch was prohibited from joining most athletic clubs in Austria so she began her competitive swimming at Hakoah Vienna, a Jewish athletic club where she was soon winning swim meets and setting national records.

Deutsch was elected "Outstanding Austrian Female Athlete of 1935" by the Austrian Sports Authority.

In 1936, she was awarded Austria's "Golden Badge of Honor" as one of the country's top three athletes that year, and selected to represent her country in the 1936 Summer Olympics in Nazi Germany.  Along with fellow swimmers Ruth Langer (1921 – 1999) and Lucie Goldner (1918 – 2000), she refused to compete at the Berlin Games in protest of Adolf Hitler, stating, "I refuse to enter a contest in a land which so shamefully persecutes my people."  This angered Austrian sports authorities who banned her from competition.

Deutsch in turn emigrated to Palestine, where she became the Israeli national champion.  After her leaving Austria, the sporting authorities there stripped her of her titles and expunged her name from the record books.

In 1995, the Austrian parliament apologized to Deutsch and reversed the sanctions imposed on her.

Haspel tells her story in Watermarks, a 2004 documentary film about the Hakoah Vienna women's swim team.

At the age of 86, Judith Haspel died in Herzliya, Israel.

A street in Herzliya, Israel and a bridge in Vienna, Austria are named after her.

See also
List of select Jewish swimmers

External links
International Jewish Sports Hall of Fame
Jews in Sports
Watermarks Official Movie Site
.

1918 births
2004 deaths
Austrian female freestyle swimmers
Austrian Jews
Israeli female freestyle swimmers
Israeli Jews
Israeli people of Austrian-Jewish descent
Jewish swimmers
Maccabiah Games competitors for Austria
Maccabiah Games swimmers
Swimmers from Vienna
Austrian emigrants to Mandatory Palestine